Allan Gilgrist is a former association football goalkeeper who represented New Zealand at international level.

Gilgrist made a solitary official international appearance for New Zealand in a 4–2 win over Fiji on 17 September 1986.

References 

Year of birth missing (living people)
Living people
New Zealand association footballers
New Zealand international footballers
Association football goalkeepers